Jim Sterk (born June 10, 1956) is an American university sports administrator who most recently served as the athletic director at the University of Missouri. He has previously served as athletic director for Portland State, Washington State, and San Diego State.

Early life and education
Jim Sterk was born on June 10, 1956, in Bellingham, Washington, and was raised in Nooksack, Washington. He received his bachelor's degree in 1980 from Western Washington University, and in 1986 received his master's degree in sports administration from Ohio University.

Athletic director

Portland State
After working in various positions at Maine, Seattle Pacific, and Tulane, Sterk became the athletic director for Portland State. While at Portland State, he oversaw the transition from Division II to Division I.

Washington State
In 2000, Sterk left Portland State and accepted a job as athletic director for Washington State. During his tenure, Washington State excelled academically in the Pac-10, and saw an increase in donations and annual gifts.

San Diego State
Sterk left Washington State to become the athletic director at San Diego State. During his time San Diego State, the athletic program improved on various levels, including their basketball team having a streak of 72 sold-out games and their football team going 11-3 and beating Cincinnati in the Hawaii Bowl in his final year.

Missouri
On September 1, 2016, Sterk became the athletic director for Missouri. Former San Diego State player Marshall Faulk commended the hiring, Under Sterk's watch, Missouri has advanced academically with its athletic teams.  On July 26, 2021, Sterk announced that he would step down as athletic director for Missouri and would leave once his replacement was found.

Personal life
Sterk is married to his wife, Debi, and they have three daughters together: Ashley, Amy and Abby.

References

Living people
1956 births
People from Bellingham, Washington
Missouri Tigers athletic directors
Western Washington University alumni
San Diego State Aztecs athletic directors
Washington State Cougars athletic directors
Portland State Vikings athletic directors